Coyotes is an American Western song written by Bob McDill and closely associated with cowboy singer Don Edwards. It appears on Edwards' 1993 album Goin' Back to Texas, and was featured on the soundtrack of the 2005 documentary film Grizzly Man.

The Great American Country network named Coyotes as one of their Top 20 Cowboy and Cowgirl Songs; Members of the Western Writers of America chose it as one of the Top 100 Western songs of all time. In a 2010 interview with Cowboys & Indians magazine, Edwards said "Bob McDill wrote the song in 1984 or '85 and couldn't pitch it to anyone. He put it in a drawer in his office and forgot about it until we started recording at Warner Brothers."

The song is a story of what happens to a man when the world as he knows it and worked in it begins to disappear. Among the things that the protagonist says "are gone" are nineteenth-century people, animals and concepts that contemporary listeners may not be familiar with: Pancho Villa, longhorns, drovers, Comanches, outlaws, Geronimo, Sam Bass, the lion, the red wolf, Quantrill (sounds like Quantro in the song, (one version he says Quanah Parker, who was a Comanche. So what sounds like Quantro may be Quanah) and Stand Watie. In the end, the protagonist is gone, too.

The song can also be found on the Hinges album by The Matt Poss Band.

The song was one of the records selected by British politician and adventurer, Rory Stewart, as part of his Desert Island Discs.

References 

1993 songs
Songs written by Bob McDill